The Pandurs were any of several light infantry military units beginning with Trenck's Pandurs, used by the Kingdom of Hungary from 1741, fighting in the War of the Austrian Succession and the Silesian Wars. Others to follow included Vladimirescu's Pandurs, a militia established by Tudor Vladimirescu in the Wallachian uprising of 1821, Pandurs of the Croatian Military Frontier, a frontier guard infantry unit deployed in the late 18th century, Pandurs of the Kingdom of Dalmatia, a frontier guard infantry unit deployed in the 19th century. In the second half of the 18th century the Republic of Venice used pandurs as a local militia to fight bandits in the Dalmatia area.

In early 19th Century Wallachia, being a Pandur was a fixed, legally recognized social status - whether or not one was a member of a specific military unit. This social condition had a considerable bearing on the central role played by Pandurs in the Wallachian uprising of 1821.

Two armoured personnel carriers made by the Austrian company Steyr-Daimler-Puch are named after the historical Austrian units: the Pandur I 6x6, and Pandur II 8x8.

Four ships have also share a namesake of Pandur units. The first was a ship of the French Navy, Pandour, renamed HMS Pandora after its capture by the Royal Navy in 1795.  The additional British ships were named HMS Pandour.

In Serbia, pandur is a slang term for a policeman.

Etymology
The term pandur made its way into military use via a Hungarian loanword, in turn originating from the Croatian term pudar, though the nasal in place of the "u" suggests a borrowing before Croatian innovated its own reflex for Proto-Slavic /ɔ̃/. "Pudar" is still applied to security guards protecting crops in vineyards and fields, and it was coined from the verb puditi (also spelled pudati) meaning to chase or scare away. The meaning of the Hungarian loanword was expanded to guards in general, including law enforcement officers. The word was likely ultimately derived from medieval Latin banderius or bannerius, meaning either a guardian of fields or summoner, or follower of a banner.

By the middle of the 18th century, law enforcement in the counties of Croatia included county pandurs or hussars who patrolled roads and pursued criminals. In 1740, the term was applied to frontier guard duty infantry deployed in the Croatian Military Frontier (Banal Frontier), specifically its Karlovac and Varaždin Generalcies. The role of the pandurs as security guards was extended to Dalmatia after the establishment of Austrian rule there in the early 19th century. The term has dropped from official use for law enforcement officials, but it is still used colloquially in Croatia and the Western Balkans in a manner akin to the English word cop. The unit raised and led by Trenck is also referred to more specifically as Trenck's Pandurs, and less frequently in Croatia than elsewhere, as Croatian Pandurs.

References

Military units and formations